Bethel Acres is a town in Pottawatomie County, Oklahoma. The population was 2,895 at the time of the 2010 census, an increase of 5.9 percent from the figure of 2,735 in 2000. It is primarily a bedroom community for people who work in the three nearby larger cities of Shawnee, Tecumseh and Oklahoma City.

History
The area comprising the present Bethel Acres was opened to non-Indian settlement September 22, 1891. The people who settled here established the Bethel school district. Bethel Acres was not incorporated until April 24, 1962, when the residents feared annexation by Shawnee, Tecumseh or Oklahoma City. They wanted to protect their rural lifestyle, especially to be free to keep livestock on their property.

In 1970, Bethel Acres had 1,083 residents. The number jumped to 2,314 in 1980 and has continued to increase through the 2010 census. Over 97 percent of the employed residents commute to work in Oklahoma City, Shawnee and Tecumseh.

On May 19, 2013, an EF4 tornado tore through Northwest Bethel Acres, and a mobile home park sustained a direct hit from this tornado, killing one person and injuring six others, two critically. This was part of the tornado outbreak of May 18–21, 2013.

Geography
Bethel Acres is located at  (35.311381, -97.027550).

Education
Four schools make up Bethel Public Schools, including an upper elementary, lower elementary, middle school and Bethel High School. Tod Harrison is the superintendent.

Demographics

As of the census of 2000, there were 2,735 people, 985 households, and 816 families residing in the town. The racial makeup of the town was 88.56% White, 0.51% African American, 5.92% Native American, 0.33% Asian, 0.04% Pacific Islander, 0.44% from other races, and 4.20% from two or more races. Hispanic or Latino of any race were 1.32% of the population.

There were 985 households, out of which 37.0% had children under the age of 18 living with them, 70.9% were married couples living together, 7.9% had a female householder with no husband present, and 17.1% were non-families. 15.2% of all households were made up of individuals, and 5.6% had someone living alone who was 65 years of age or older. The average household size was 2.72 and the average family size was 3.01.

In the town, the population was spread out, with 27.7% under the age of 18, 6.9% from 18 to 24, 27.5% from 25 to 44, 25.2% from 45 to 64, and 12.7% who were 65 years of age or older. The median age was 38 years. For every 100 females, there were 103.0 males. For every 100 females age 18 and over, there were 97.9 males.

The median income for a household in the town was $43,961, and the median income for a family was $45,000. Males had a median income of $37,390 versus $24,185 for females. The per capita income for the town was $18,826. About 5.3% of families and 6.3% of the population were below the poverty line, including 9.1% of those under age 18 and 6.4% of those age 65 or over.

Notable person
 Wade Hayes, singer

Religion

Churches
Bethel United Methodist Church

References

External links
 Encyclopedia of Oklahoma History and Culture - Bethel Acres
 Bethel Public Schools website

Oklahoma City metropolitan area
Towns in Pottawatomie County, Oklahoma
Towns in Oklahoma